Bertrand Damaisin (born October 27, 1968 in Lyon, Rhône) is a retired judoka from France. He claimed the bronze medal in the Men's Light-Middleweight (– 78 kg) division at the 1992 Summer Olympics in Barcelona, Spain. In the bronze medal match he defeated Sweden's Lars Adolfsson.

References

External links
 

1968 births
Living people
French male judoka
Judoka at the 1992 Summer Olympics
Olympic judoka of France
Olympic bronze medalists for France
Sportspeople from Lyon
Olympic medalists in judo
Medalists at the 1992 Summer Olympics
20th-century French people